The Komorniki Festival of Organ and Chamber Music is a summer series of concerts held annually in Komorniki, Greater Poland Voivodeship, Poland. The festival was founded by Australian-based Polish conductor and organist Krzysztof Czerwiński, who also serves as its artistic director.

The festival features choral, organ and chamber music concerts among its events held in local churches including St Andrew's Church, Komorniki, St Florian's Church, Wiry, St Faustyna's Church, Plewiska and St Hedwig of Silesia Church, Poznań.

2015 Edition

Ensembles
 Tubicinatores Gedanenses

Soloists
 Łukasz Kuropaczewski – guitar
 Maciej Frąckiewicz – accordion
 Ryszard Żołędziewski – saxophone
 Taras Riznyak - tenor

Organists
 Piotr Rojek
 Gedymin Grubba
 Błażej Musiałczyk
 Krzysztof Czerwiński

2014 Edition

Ensembles
 Hevelius Brass

Soloists
 Rafał Kobylinski – tenor
 Kacper Chabrowski – accordion
 Ania Karpowicz – flute

Organists
 Marek Stefanski
 Ewa Sawoszczuk
 Michal Markuszewski
 Krzysztof Czerwiński

2013 Edition

Ensembles
 The Cracow Brass Quintet

Soloists
 Pawel Hulisz – trumpet
 Mariusz Monczak – violin
 Anna Lecka – soprano

Organists
 Paul Rosoman
 Bogdan Narloch
 Marcin Lecki
 Krzysztof Czerwiński

2012 Edition

Ensembles
 Trio Con Brio
 The Cracow Trombone Quartet

Soloists
 Michał Stanikowski – guitar
 Jakub Drygas – clarinet
 Ian Maksin – cello

Organists
 Jerzy Kukla
 Gedymin Grubba
 Krzysztof Czerwiński

2011 Edition

Ensembles
 The Sydney Consort

Soloists
 Alina Urbanczyk-Mroz – soprano
 Anna Adamiak – mezzo-soprano
 Adam Musialski – violin

Organists
 Adam Klarecki
 Robert Grudzien
 Marek Kudlicki
 Krzysztof Czerwiński

2010 Edition

Ensembles
 Gdanski Kwartet Kontrabasowy
 Capella Bydgostiensis

Soloists
 Jolanta Sosnowska – pila sopranowa
 Hannah Berensen – soprano

Organists
 Marietta Kruzel-Sosnowska
 Jan Bartlomiej Bokszczanin
 Christopher Berensen
 Krzysztof Czerwiński

2009 Edition

Ensembles
 Affabre Concinui
 Parnassos

Soloists
 Janusz Cieplinski – trumpet
 Jolanta Solowiej – soprano

Organists
 Henryk Gwardak
 Jaroslaw Ciecierski
 Krzysztof Czerwiński
 Adam Klareck

2008 Edition

Ensembles
 Baltycki Kwintet Dety
 Poznań Brass

Soloists
 Jacek Greszta - bass
 Karol Lipinski-Branka - violin

Organists
 Fatima Branka
 Krzysztof Czerwiński
 Waldemar Krawiec
 Piotr Rojek

2007 Edition

Ensembles
 Ars Antiqua
 Polish Baroque Orchestra
 Pueri Cantores Tarnovienses

Soloists
 Krzysztof Meisinger - guitar
 Przemyslaw Wawrzyniak - bagpipes

Organists
 Krzysztof Czerwiński
 Grzegorz Piekarz
 Ewa Polska
 Jozef Serafin

2006 Edition

Ensembles
 Polish Baroque Orchestra
 Poznań Cathedral Choir of Men and Boys

Soloists
 Ewa Murawska - flute
 Anita Rywalska-Sosnowska - soprano

Organists
 Krzysztof Czerwiński
 Jakub Garbacz
 Gedymin Grubba
 Krzysztof Lesniewicz

CD recording
CD recording of the Festival

External links
 Festival website 
 Komorniki - official website (in English)

Music festivals in Poland
Chamber music festivals
Classical music festivals in Poland